Andrea Reinkemeyer (born 1976) is an American composer from Portland, Oregon. She graduated with a bachelor's degree from the University of Oregon and continued her studies in composition at the University of Michigan, graduating with a master's and doctoral degree. She was awarded a 2017 Virginia B. Toulmin Orchestral Commission, 2022-23 Edith Green Distinguished Professor and 2019 Julie Olds and Thomas Hellie Creative Achievement Award for Linfield Faculty; her Smoulder for Wind Ensemble was awarded the 2021 Alex Shapiro Prize in the 40th Annual Search for New Music by the International Alliance of Women in Music (IAWM) and named a 2020 finalist for the National Band Association William D. Revelli Composition Contest.

Her music has been described as "haunting", "clever, funky, jazzy and virtuosic".

While at the University of Michigan, Reinkemeyer taught as a graduate student instructor in electronic composition. After completing her education, she took a position teaching composition, theory and technology at Bowling Green State University in Ohio. She is currently an Associate Professor of Music Composition and Theory at Linfield University in McMinnville, Oregon.

She married Brian Amer and has one daughter. Reinkemeyer has also worked teaching music in Detroit community outreach programs.

Works
Selected works include:
Into the Labyrinth (2022) for Narrator, Drum set, Wind Ensemble, and Wind Band (orchestrator) 
Letter to a friend (2022) for Soprano, Horn in F, and Piano (Megan Levad and D. Allen, poets)
The Diver (2022) for Soprano and Piano (Megan Levad, poet)
Smoulder (2021) for Orchestra
Red Flame (2021) for Flute and Marimba
Hustle and Bustle (2021) for Concert Band
Triptych: Three Disasters a Virtual Opera Scene (2020); Patrick Wohlmut, libretto
Smoulder (2019) for Wind Ensemble
Opening Up (2019) for Narrator and String Quartet
Water Sings Fire (2018) for Orchestra
in the speaking silence (2018) for Alto Saxophone and Bassoon
Saturation (2017) for Soprano Saxophone and Piano
From Cycles of Eternity (2017) for Women's Vocal Ensemble; Henrietta Cordelia Ray, poet
Crisp Point Fanfare (2017) for Brass Quintet
When Justice Reigns (2016) for Mixed Choir; Janine Applegate, poet
The Thaw (2016) for Soprano, Tenor, Mixed Choir and Wind Ensemble; Artis Henderson, poet
NaamJai (Liquid Heart) (2015) for Orchestra
Wings to Air (2013) for Flute
Things Heard, Misunderstood (2012) for Alto Saxophone
Wrought Iron (2012) for Flute and Percussion
Dos Danzas (2010) for Concert Band
Wild Silk (2009) for Baritone Saxophone, Percussion and Piano
Half Moon Nocturne (2007) for Clarinet in B-flat, Bassoon, Horn in F, Piano, Violin, Viola, Cello & Bass
Souvenirs (2006) for Piano
Lured by the Horizon (2005) for Orchestra 
Through Leaves (2004) for Percussion and Fixed Media
Elegy (2001) for Viola and Fixed Media 
#@&%!* (expletive deleted) (2000) for Percussion Quartet
Four Poems for Robin (1999, rev. 2006) for Soprano and Viola; Gary Snyder, poet

References

1976 births
Living people
20th-century classical composers
American music educators
American women classical composers
American classical composers
Musicians from Portland, Oregon
University of Oregon alumni
University of Michigan School of Music, Theatre & Dance alumni
University of Michigan faculty
Bowling Green State University faculty
20th-century American women musicians
20th-century American composers
21st-century American women musicians
Women music educators
20th-century women composers
American women academics
Classical musicians from Oregon